The role of Mayor of Carlisle dates from 1231. Originally the mayor was elected by the Freemen of the borough but since 1835 has been chosen by elected councillors.

List of mayors
The following were mayors of Carlisle, Cumbria, England:

Before 20th century
1545: Edward Aglionby, MP for Carlisle, 1529.High Sheriff of Cumberland, 1544
1554: Robert Dalton, MP for Carlisle, 1558
1566–67: Robert Dalton
Several times. Edward Aglionby, MP for 1584 and 1593
1597: Thomas Blennerhassett, MP for Carlisle, 1584, 1586 and 1604
1636 and 1648: Richard Barwis, MP for Carlisle, 1628, 1640 
1672: Sir Christopher Musgrave, 4th Baronet, MP for Carlisle, 1661; Westmorland, 1690; Appleby, 1695
1683: Edward Howard, 2nd Earl of Carlisle, MP for Cumberland, 1679; Carlisle, 1681 
1715: Thomas Stanwix, Governor of Gibraltar
1844: James Steel (1797–1851), editor of the Carlisle Journal
1845: James Steel (1797–1851)
1846: James Steel (1797–1851)
1855: Robert Ferguson, MP for Carlisle, 1874
1858: Robert Ferguson
1881: Robert S. Ferguson (1837–1900)
1882: Robert S. Ferguson (1837–1900)
1883: Francis Peter Dixon
1884: Francis Peter Dixon
1897: Francis Peter Dixon
1898: Francis Peter Dixon

20th century
Primary source: Carlisle Encyclopaedia
1899–1900 Christopher Ling
1900–1901: John Hurst
1901–02: Benjamin Scott
1902–03: John Maxwell
1903–04: Frederick William Chance (MP for Carlisle, 1905–10)
1904–05: Francis Peter Dixon
1905–07: William Irwin Robert Crowder
1907–08: William Nanson Donald
1908–09: William Bell Maxwell
1909–10: William Phillips
1910–11: Sir Benjamin Scott
1911–12: Matthew Johnstone (died in office - Sir Benjamin Scott stepped in for the remainder of the term)
1912–14: Spencer Charles Ferguson (son of Richard Saul Ferguson)
1914–15: Francis Peter Dixon
1915–16: Walter Phelp Gibbings
1916–17: Joseph Pattinson Buck
1917–19: Bertram Carr
1919–20: Thomas Ridley
1920–21: Henry Kenyon Campbell
1921–22: Archibald Creighton (Liberal PPC for Carlisle, 1929)
1922–23: Robert Dalton
1923–24: Hubert Woodville
1924–25: Robert Burns
1925–26: George Edward Edmondson
1926–27: Archibald Creighton (second term)
1927–28: Joseph Henderson
1928–29: Thomas Gardhouse Charlton
1929–30: Sir Robert Christopher Chance (son of former mayor Frederick William Chance)
1930–31: Frederick William Tassell
1931–32: Matthew Thompson
1932–33: Herbert Atkinson
1933–34: Ebenezer Gray
1934–35: James Cuthbert Studholme
1935–36: John Robert Potts
1936–37: Richard Stanley Harrison
1937–38: John Walker Osborne
1938–39: Tom Dobinson
1939–41: Matthew Thompson
1941–42: Edgar Grierson (MP for Carlisle, 1945–50)
1942–44: Alexander C. G. Thomson
1944–45: Wilfred Goody
1945–46: Isa Graham
1946–47: Harold Greenop
1947–49: Elizabeth Welsh
1949–50: Gerald Sheehan
1950–51: Albert Henry Dawson Partridge
1951–52: George Henry Routledge
1952–53: George Bowman
1953–54: Alfred Clement Redvers Punnett
1954–55: Thomas Dawson Lancaster
1955–56: Harold Nelson Sutcliffe
1956–57: Ritson Graham
1957–58: Jessie Martin
1958–59: Irving Burrow
1959–60: William John Hunter
1960–61: Thomas Souness
1961–62: Thomas Logie MacDonald, astronomer
1962–63: Francis Derry
1963–64: David Moffat Hamilton
1964–65: Howard Glaister
1965–66: James Smith
1966–67: Gerard Joseph Coogan
1967–68: Mary Kathleen Sibson
1968–69: Joseph Jackson Bell
1969–70: John Hayhurst OBE
1970–71: Noel Thomas O'Reilly
1971–72: Herbert Fawcett
1972–73: Archibald Caven
1973–74: Hugh Little
1974–75: Thomas Johnson
1975–76: Thomas MacMillan Bisland
1976–77: George Edward Dudson
1977–78: Jim Long
1978–79: Gordon Henry Griffiths
1979–80: David Weedall
1980–81: Walter Sydney Bell
1981–82: Alan Graham
1982–83: Donald Fell
1983–84: Trudy Whalley
1984–85: Ian Stockdale
1985–86: Keith Aitken
1986–87: Harry Gallagher
1987–88: Victor Davis
1988–89: Cyril Weber
1989–90: R. C. Hayhoe
1990–91: John Amos
1991–92: Elsie Coleman
1992–93: Harold Evans
1993–94: Jayne Prewitt
1994–95: Colin Paisley
1995–96: Alfred Brumwell
1996–97: Craig Johnston
1997–98: John Metcalfe
1998–99: Heather Bradley
1999–2000: John Collier

21st century
 source (2000-2008): Carlisle Encyclopaedia
2000–01: Ray Knapton
2001–02: Doreen Parsons
2002–03: Alan Toole
2003–04: Judith Pattinson
2004–05: Ralph Aldersey
2005–06: Sandra Fisher
2006–07: Peter Farmer
2007–08: Elizabeth Mallinson
2008–09: Jacqui Geddes
2009–10: William Graham
2010–11: Mary Styth
2011–12: Barry Ogilvie Earp
2012–13: David Wilson
2013–14: Ray Bloxham
2014–15: Steven Bowditch
2015–16: Steve Layden
2016-17: Colin Stothard
2017-18: Trish Vasey
2018-19: Jessica Riddle
2019-2021: Marilyn Bowman extended period due to COVID Pandemic
2021-2022: Pamela Birks

References

Carlisle
Cumbria-related lists